Oscar Ludeña (born 28 March 1946) is a Peruvian boxer. He competed in the men's heavyweight event at the 1972 Summer Olympics. At the 1972 Summer Olympics, he lost to Peter Hussing of West Germany.

References

1946 births
Living people
Heavyweight boxers
Peruvian male boxers
Olympic boxers of Peru
Boxers at the 1972 Summer Olympics
Place of birth missing (living people)
20th-century Peruvian people